Reshon Shemar Phillip (born January 27, 1998) is a Canadian soccer player who currently plays for Simcoe County Rovers of League1 Ontario.

Early life
Born to Grenadian parents, Phillip started his career with Toronto Eagles SC at the age of 4. He later joined North Mississauga SC, with whom he won a U15 Ontario Cup.

Playing career
Having joined Toronto FC Academy, he was called up to Toronto FC II, the feeder club of the MLS side, in 2015. Phillip made his professional debut in a 2–2 draw against Charlotte Independence on August 30, 2015. He scored his first senior goal a week later, netting two goals in a 3–2 win over FC Montreal on September 5, 2015 in his first professional start, which earned USL Team of the Week honours. Phillip was called up to the Toronto FC II once again for the 2016 USL season.

In the fall of 2017, Phillip made a move to play with Indian Hills Community College, a National Junior College Athletic Association school, helping them to qualify for their first national tournament appearance in program history. He was named to the ICCAC All-Conference team after leading the conference in assists with 16 (6ht highest in the nation) to go along with 12 goals. He was named a 2017 United Soccer Coaches Junior College Division I Second Team All-American.

In 2018, he played for Master's FA in League1 Ontario. In 2019, he switched to play for the Oakville Blue Devils. In 2021, he began the season with the Blue Devils for one match, before returning to Master's where he scored 11 regular season goals to be named East Division MVP and a East 1st team All-Star, also scoring a brace in a penalty kick shootout loss in the playoff semi-finals to eventual champions, Guelph United.

In 2022, he signed with the expansion side Simcoe County Rovers of League1 Ontario.

International 
In 2010, he was part of a U12 Canada East squad that faced Canada West to try to represent the nation at the Danone Nations Cup in South Africa. In 2014, Phillip was first involved in an official Canadian youth camp as a 16-year-old.

Career statistics

Club

External links

References 

1998 births
Living people
Association football forwards
Canadian soccer players
Toronto FC II players
League1 Ontario players
USL Championship players
Blue Devils FC players
Indian Hills Warriors athletes
Master's FA players
Toronto FC players
Simcoe County Rovers FC players
North Mississauga SC players
Canadian people of Grenadian descent
Soccer players from Brampton